LGBT ageing addresses issues and concerns related to the ageing of lesbian, gay, bisexual and transgender (LGBT) people. Older LGBT people are marginalised by: a) younger LGBT people, because of ageism; and b) by older age social networks because of  homophobia, biphobia, transphobia, heteronormativity (the assumption that everyone is heterosexual), heterosexism (the privileging of heterosexuality), prejudice and discrimination towards LGBT people.

Research overview 
There has been a growth of interest in lesbian, gay, bisexual and trans (LGBT) ageing in recent years. There is a growing body of academic literature on the subject from the USA, the UK, Australia, Canada, the Netherlands, Israel and Ireland. There is also a number of documents from social policy and campaign organisations, particularly in relation to health and social care issues, for example from the Metlife Mature Market Institute.

The earliest waves of research sought ‘to challenge the image of the lonely and bitter old queer’ and ‘suggested that older gay men and lesbians are not alone, isolated, or depressed but benefit from navigating a stigmatized identity through crisis competence’, which also informs resilience in dealing with inequalities associated with older age. Subsequent authors questioned the positive bias which may have been present in some of these initial studies. More recent research has focused on health, housing and social care and support needs, older LGBT rights   and also the differences between and among older LGBT individuals, particularly in relation to gender. There is a lack of research on black, asian and minority ethnic (BAME) older LGBT individuals, ageing and bisexuality, issues of class and other intersections.

Informal social support 

Present cohorts of older lesbian, gay and bisexual (LGB) people are more likely to be estranged from their biological families, less likely to have children, and thus less likely to have access to intergenerational social support in later life. They may have strong ‘family of friends’ networks, but as these tend to be formed by people of similar ages, when, in older age, they need increased care and support at around the same time, they are then also less likely to be able to provide it to one another. This means that older LGB people are more likely to need formal social care and support sooner, and in greater numbers, than older heterosexual people, particularly, for those in couples, after a partner has died. Older transgender people with children, particularly those who have transitioned in later life, can experience rejection from biological families and so even those with children may lack access to intergenerational support.

Housing and social care 

Mainstream housing and social care provision (domicilary/home care, community care, supported housing, retirement and nursing home facilities) is ill-equipped to meet the needs of older LGBT people. Many older LGBT people currently living in older age accommodation or care spaces try to conceal their lives, identities and significant relationships if they can. They fear being misunderstood, vulnerable to prejudice and discrimination or isolated from their families and friends. They are especially concerned about care if they develop dementia, in terms of 'coming out to care' whether their identities will be respected, their memories validated, and who will be there to speak up for them. In response to these issues and concerns a range of good practice guidelines have been developed in the US, for example focussing on cultural competence or more practical step-by-step advice, UK, and Australia. However, it is not yet clear how many commissioners and providers of services for older people are following these guidelines, and many older LGBT people continue to consider older age care spaces to be unsafe places in which to spend their final years.

See also 
 LGBT Aging Project
 LGBT retirement issues in the United States
 Nursing home care
 Services & Advocacy for GLBT Elders
 LGBT
 LGBT culture

References

Complementary references 
 Heaphy, Brian Yip, Andrew and Thompson, Debbie (2004). ‘Ageing In A Non-Heterosexual Context.’ Ageing & Society, 24(6): 881-902.
 Heaphy, Brian (2009). ‘The Storied, Complex Lives of Older GLBT Adults; Choice and its limits in older lesbian and gay narratives of relational life.’ Journal of GLBT Family Studies, 5: 119–138.
 Jones, Rebecca (2011). ‘Imagining bisexual futures: Positive, non-normative later life.’  Journal of Bisexuality, 11(2-3): 245-270.
 Jones, R. & R. Ward (eds) LGBT Issues: Looking Beyond Categories: 42-55.  Edinburgh: Dunedin.
 Persson, D. I. (2009). Unique challenges of transgender aging: Implications from the literature. Journal of Gerontological Social Work, 52(6), 633–646.
 Rosenfeld, Dana (2003). The Changing of the Guard: Lesbian and Gay Elders, Identity and Social Change. Philadelphia: Temple University Press.
 Sullivan, K M, 2014, Acceptance in the Domestic Environment: The Experience of Senior Housing for Lesbian, Gay, Bisexual, and Transgender Seniors, Journal of Gerontological Social Work, 57(2-4), 235-250.
 Traies, Jane (2012). ‘Women Like That: Older Lesbians in the UK.’ In R. Ward, I. Rivers and M. Sutherland (eds) Lesbian, Gay, Bisexual and Transgender Ageing: Biographical Approaches for Inclusive Care and Support, pp 76–82, London and Philadelphia: Jessica Kingsley.
 Wathern, T, 2013, Building a sense of community: Including older LGBT in the way we develop and deliver housing with care, London: Housing Learning & Improvement Network.
 Westwood, S. (2013) ‘My Friends are my Family’: an argument about the limitations of contemporary law's recognition of relationships in later life. Journal of Social Welfare & Family Law 35(3), 347-363.
 Wilkens, Jill. (2015). Loneliness and Belongingness in Older Lesbians: The Role of Social Groups as “Community”. Journal of lesbian studies, 19(1), 90-101.
 Willis, P, et al., 2014, Swimming upstream: the provision of inclusive care to older lesbian, gay and bisexual (LGB) adults in residential and nursing environments in Wales, Ageing & Society, DOI: 10.1017/S0144686X14001147.
 Witten, T.M. (2015) Elder Transgender Lesbians: Exploring the Intersection of Age, Lesbian Sexual Identity, and Transgender Identity, Journal of Lesbian Studies, 19(1), 73-89.

 
LGBT and society